The Mari Forest or Mariy Chodra (Mari and ) is a national park, located largely in Morkinsky, Zvenigovsky, and Volzhsky Districts of the Mari El Republic, Russia.

Flora and fauna
Mariy Chodra was created to protect rare plants: more than 115 rare plant species are documented. There are fourteen tourist routes in the park; the most popular attractions being Yalchik, Glukhoye, and Kichiyer Lakes, the rafting  on the Ilet and Yushut Rivers, Pugachov's Oak, and the Maple Mountain.

There are more than fourteen tourist centers in Mariy Chodra, which play a major role in the recreation of the republics of Mari El, Tatarstan, and Chuvashia.

References

External links
 
 Путешествия по России - RussiaOutdoors
 Article about Mari Chodra National Park

National parks of Russia
Geography of Mari El
Environment of Mari El
Protected areas established in 1985
1985 establishments in the Soviet Union